Pellizzano (Plicià in local dialect) is a comune (municipality) in Trentino in the northern Italian region Trentino-Alto Adige/Südtirol, located about  northwest of Trento.

Pellizzano borders the following municipalities: Rabbi, Peio, Mezzana, Vermiglio, Ossana and Pinzolo.

References

External links

Cities and towns in Trentino-Alto Adige/Südtirol